Revolt On Antares is a science fiction themed microgame designed by Tom Moldvay and produced by TSR, Inc. in 1981. Similar to the microgames produced by Steve Jackson Games, it was sold in a transparent plastic shell case and came with rulebook, full-color hex-map, counters, and one six-sided die. Other games in this series (called "minigames" by TSR) include They've Invaded Pleasantville!, Remember the Alamo, Attack Force, Vampyre, Viking Gods, Icebergs and Saga.

The action of the game takes place on Imhirrhos, the ninth planet in the Antares system. Two to four players assume the roles of leaders of different factions fighting for control of the planet as the influence of Earth's Imperial Terran Empire begins to weaken. The factions include seven different ruling families or houses, Terran Empire forces, natives, and alien Silakkans. Players can choose from one of three different game scenarios.

House Leaders
Each of the seven houses has a leader with varying numbers of forces to command such as Hovercraft, Jump Troops, Laser Tanks, and Power Infantry as well as one Artifact (see below). Each leader also possesses a special ability.

House Braganza, led by Catherine "the Mad" Braganza who can summon lightning
House Edistyn, led by Nureb Khan Edistyn who has the power of precognition
House Fitzgerald, led by Simon Fitzgerald who can create morale-boosting ion waves
House Kinrabe, led by Barracuda Kinrabe, an illusionist
House Mackenzie, led by Black Dougal Mackenzie who can teleport
House Orsini, led by Messalina Orsini who has the power of fascination
House Sessedi, led by Ariton Sessedi, a telepath

Galactic Heroes
If a house leader is killed during combat, the player has the opportunity to recruit a Galactic Hero to replace him. Like house leaders, Galactic Heroes also have special powers or lead additional forces.

Andros, an alien android who can summon a "Phantom Regiment"
Corvus Andromeda, an intergalactic assassin
Doctor Death, a criminal who has the power to create an army of zombies
Emerald Eridani, the commander of the Emerald Company laser tank battalion
The Iron General, the cyborg leader of a group of mercenary laser tanks
Lyra Starfire, a scantily clad adventuress and commander of an airjet squadron
The Nullspace Kid, a young adventurer and airjet squadron pilot
Skarn 3, an alien mercenary who commands a band of jump troops
Subadai O'Reilly, the commander of "O'Reilly's Raiders," a power infantry battalion
Tovan Palequire, an intergalactic smuggler and arms dealer

Other Factions
In addition to the seven house leaders there are three other power groups that may or may not come into play depending on the game scenario.

Ward Serpentine, leader of the Terrans
Mirrhos, leader of the natives
Magron, leader of the alien Silakkans

Artifacts
Each house has possession of a special alien artifact, chosen at random at the beginning of the game.

Devastator
Dimensional Plane
Energy Drainer
Field Generator
Force Cannon
Sonic Imploder
UFO

Scenarios and Gameplay
Revolt on Antares has three different game scenarios: Revolt Against Terra (the basic game), The Silakka Invasion, and Power Politics on Imirrhos.

In Revolt Against Terra, the game is played over the course of ten turns. Each turn consists of ten ordered phases where players take actions such as movement, combat, recruitment, and forging alliances. The player with the greatest number of victory points at the end of ten turns wins the game. Victory points are earned for owning or capturing different economic zones and for owned or captured house fortresses.
The Silakka Invasion
Power Politics on Imirrhos

Reception
William A. Barton reviewed Revolt On Antares in The Space Gamer No. 44. Barton commented that "Although Revolt On Antares isn't overly exciting, it can be an interesting little game to play, especially if you like the smaller games with an SF (make that science fantasy) flavor."

In a retrospective review of Revolt On Antares in Black Gate, Ty Johnston said "Remembered fondly today by many old-school players, Revolt on Antares has become something of a collector's piece, often selling for nearly a hundred U.S. dollars on various online sites. Is it worth it? Perhaps, especially to those of us who warmly recall it as a part of our childhood."

Reviews
Asimov's Science Fiction v7 n3 (1983 03)

References

External links

Board games introduced in 1981
Science fiction board wargames
TSR, Inc. games